Woodlands style, also called the Woodlands school, Legend painting, Medicine painting, and Anishnabe painting, is a genre of painting among First Nations and Native American artists from the Great Lakes area, including northern Ontario and southwestern Manitoba. The majority of the Woodland artists belong to the Anishinaabeg, notably the Ojibwe, Odawa, and Potawatomi, as well as the Oji-Cree and the Cree.

Origin
The style was founded by Norval Morrisseau (Bingwi Neyaashi Anishinaabe), a First Nations Ojibwe artist from Northern Ontario, Canada. He learned Ojibwe history and culture primarily from his grandfather Moses "Potan" Nanakonagos and in the 1950s collected oral history of his community. Their history and cosmology has provided inspiration and subject matter for his paintings. His also drew upon his personal dreams, visions, Morrisseau said, "all my painting and drawing is really a continuation of the shaman's scrolls." and the Eckankar religion. Ojibwe intaglio, pictographs, petrographs rock art and birch bark scrolls, Wiigwaasabak, were stylistic antecedents of the Woodland style.

Style
This visionary style emphasizes outlines and X-ray views of people, animals, and plant life. Colours are vivid, even garish. While Morrisseau painted on birch bark initially, the media of Woodland style tends to be Western, such as acrylic, gouache, or watercolor paints on paper, wood panels, or canvas.

Woodland style artists

Ahmoo Angeconeb (Lac Seul First Nation, 1955–2017)
Jackson Beardy (Anishinini, 1944–1984)
Benjamin Chee Chee (Eabametoong Ojibwe, 1944–1977)
Shirley Cheechoo (Cree, b. 1952)
Kelly Church (Gun Lake Potawatomi/Odawa/Ojibwe, b. 1967)
Eddy Cobiness (Buffalo Point Ojibwa, 1933–1996)
Blake Debassige (M'Chigeeng Ojibwe, b. 1956)
Tom Hogan, (Ojibwe, 1955–2014)
Abe Kakepetum (Sandy Lake Oji-Cree)
Norval Morrisseau (ᒥᐢᒁᐱᐦᐠ ᐊᓂᒥᐦᑮ/ Miskwaabik Animikii) (Bingwi Neyaashi Ojibwe, ca. 1932–2007)
Daphne Odjig (Odawa/Potawatomi, 1919–2016)
Carl Ray (Sandy Lake Cree, 1943–1978)
Roy Thomas (Long Lake Ojibway, 1949-2004)
Jackie Traverse (Lake St. Martin Ojibway, b. 1968)

See also
Professional Native Indian Artists Inc.
Triple K Co-operative

Notes

References
 Berlo, Janet C. and Ruth B. Phillips. Native North American Art. Oxford: Oxford University Press, 1998: 97-8. .

Further reading
Dawson,K.C.A. (1966) "The Kaministikwia Itaglio Dog Effigy Mound." Ontario Archeology. No.9 (June):25-84.
 Pollack, Jack. The Art of Norval Morrisseau. Toronto: Metheren Press, 1979. ASIN B001BY1VHU.
Rajnovich,Grace. "Reading Rock Art." Interpreting the Indian Rock Paintings of the Canadian Shield. Dundum Press Ltd., 1994'
 Robinson, Donald C. Travels To the House of Invention. Bolton, Ontario: Key Porter Books, Ltd., 1997. .
Selwyn Dewdney and  King Kenneth E. Indian Rock Paintings of the Great Lakes. University of Toronto Press, 1967.

External links

"The Socio-Political Influence of Woodlands Art," Native Art in Canada
 Norval Morrisseau, Woodland style blog

 
Art movements
Anishinaabe culture
Indigenous painting of the Americas
Great Lakes tribal culture